The Biomedical Research Center (BRC) is a research center at Qatar University focusing on biomedical research. BRC was founded in 2014, and partners with the Ministry of Public Health (Qatar), and Hamad Medical Corporation (HMC).

Background 
The incidence of genetic disorders in Qatar is high. Qatar's top three causes of death are cancer, heart diseases and diabetes. The government saw the creation of BRC as a strategy for proactively preventing diseases, to foster public health. In this context, having an advanced, world-class research center in health and biomedical sciences is indispensable for Qatar.

Accreditation 
BRC labs received the ISO/IEC - 17025 accreditation from the American Association for Laboratory Accreditation (A2LA), which reflects their commitment to high-quality research standards.

Areas of Research Focus 
BRC cultivated highly productive research focused on the following domains:

 Infectious diseases (Virology)
 Infectious diseases (Microbiology)
 Metabolic disorders
 Biomedical omics

Research with Impact 

Since its inauguration in 2014, BRC research outcome curve shows tremendous achievement in the number of published research papers with more than 530 publications.

The following are some of research projects that demonstrate BRC commitment to research that is tackling the national problems, and beyond:

 Antibiotic profiling of antibiotics resistant microbes in humans and animals (One health approach).
 Identified for the first time the reason of why some obese people gets type-2 diabetes while others do not.
 Conducted six research on COVID-19 to assist in fighting and recovery.
 Provided a study on protection against the Omicron variant in Qatar.
 Decoded the genetic code of Qatari falcons and various endangered animal species.
 DNA sequence of the Dugong (sea cow).
 Study a nanomedicine-based preventative strategy to controlling diseases and improve health.

Zebrafish Research Model 

BRC Introduced the use of Zebrafish as an animal model in biomedical research at QU and established for it a facility in 2015. The facility is used as a research unit to study many genetic diseases. Therefore, Ministry of Public Health (Qatar) clearly articulated an institutional research policy (IRP) on human use of Zebrafish in research, and QU circulated it to QU community for implementation.

The following advantages make Zebrafish an ideal animal model for biomedical research:

 Zebrafish genes are similar to human genes, thus a good predictive model for human development and diseases.
 Zebrafish can spawn hundreds of embryos a week and this allows statistically significant analyses at a minimal cost.
 Embryos are transparent and that make them ideal for microscopic imaging of life processes.
 Embryos are simple and develop externally to the mother and grow to maturity within a 2-3 month, thus can be viewed and manipulated seamlessly.

BRC Facilities 

The BRC has many world-class facilites and equipped with the state-of-the-art technologies. The following facilities are the most notable:

 Zebrafish aquatic system
 Biosafety level 3 (BSL3) built by CERTEK, USA. It is equipped for viral- and bacterial research on risk group 3 pathogens.
 Sequencing unit to conduct state-of-the-art research in genomics.

Future Endeavors 

 Leverage QU interdisciplinary status.
 Develop scientific research on communicable and non-communicable diseases.
 Increase research outputs of high impact with focus in areas of national needs.
 Extend collaboration in research, services and education outreach.

See also 

 Qatar University
 Qatar University Library
 Mariam Al Maadeed
 Sidra Medical and Research Center
 List of hospitals in Qatar

References

External links 

 Research and Graduate Studies Office at Qatar University
 Qatar University Newsroom
 Zebrafish Development

2014 establishments in Qatar
Organisations based in Doha
Research institutes in Qatar
Educational institutions established in 2014
Qatar University
Education by subject
Science education
Clinical research
Diseases and disorders
Public health
Obstetrics
Cardiology